()(1798–1843), or  was a Carnatic Musician from Kerala, India. He was a contemporary of Saint Tyāgarāja and Swathi Thirunal Rama Varma. He was also adept in playing musical instruments like Chenda, Edakka and Thimila. His expertise in singing in the six degrees of geometric speed earned him the title Ṣaṭkāla. By legend, Endaro Mahanubhavulu, one of Thyagaraja's most famous compositions, was composed after he heard Marar sing. He is said to have used a Tamburu having seven strings.

Early life

Govinda Marar was born in 1798 at Vennimala, near to Puthuppally of Travancore in  Kerala. His parents belonged to the community of Marars who performed the traditional singing in the temples of Kerala. He took to singing from a very early age. He received his musical lessons from Haripad Ramaswamy Bhagavathar.

He is said to have used a Tamburu having seven strings. At the age of 21, he left his home to begin a life of wandering. He is believed to have sung in many important temples all over Kerala.

Death

After leading a wandering life for a long time, he reached the temple of Panduranga in Pandharpur, Maharashtra. He was revered as Paramahamsa Govinda Das. The temple records note that he attained Samadhi in 1843.

Shatkala Govinda Marar Smaraka Kalasamithy
Prof. M. P. Manmadhan (late) – the eminent sarvodaya leader and social worker heard of Sri. Govinda Marar from a speech delivered by the great Malayalam poet Ulloor S. Parameswara Iyer. He decided to set up a suitable memorial to the saint musician at his birthplace at Ramamangalam. The Shatkala Govinda Marar Smaraka Kala Samithy took birth under the chairmanship of Prof. M. P. Manmadhan in 1980. The Samithy engages in the establishment of several institutes to promote the study of traditional music and temple arts of South India with facilities for advanced research in all branches of arts and music. After the death of Prof. M. P. Manmadhan, Sri. C. Radhakrishnan (writer, film director), Sri. M. P. Gopalakrishnan (Rtd. R. D. O.) and Prof. Mavelikkara Prabhakara Varma (musician) lead the Samithy. Prof. George S. Paul (art journalist and columnist) currently leads the Samithy.

A memorial building consisting of class rooms and auditorium was set up with the help of Central/State Governments, Local Self Government Institutions and well-wishers in the vicinity of the Narasimhamoorthy Perumthrikkovil. Classes have been arranged to teach classical music (vocal and instrumental), classical dance and temple arts.

Shatkala Govinda Marar Sangeetholsavam
Shatkala Sangeetha Sabha was started in Moovattupuzha in 1980 by two young lovers of music, Narayan Ramdas Iyer and Pradeep M Deo with the help of music lover and astrologer Sundaresan Nair and Mridangist Panangad Chandran. An inaugural concert was organised by the two at the MELA Auditorium in which Dr. Mangalampalli Balamurali Krishna performed a four hour long concert.

Subsequently, a musical festival dedicated to the memory of the musical prodigy is being conducted under the auspices of Kerala Sangeetha Nataka Academy from 1992. Several famous artists from South India have come to Ramamangalam to pay their homage before the saint musician during the last two and a half decades.

References

External links

Kerala Gov-Music
Shadkala Govinda Marar
14th Shadkala Govinda Marar Music Festival
Kerala-Gov

Malayali people
Male Carnatic singers
Carnatic singers
1798 births
1843 deaths
19th-century Indian male classical singers
Singers from Kerala
People from Ernakulam district